Julen Jon Guerrero Landabaso (born 14 April 2004) is a Basque professional footballer currently playing as a midfielder for Real Madrid.

Club career

Early career
Born in Bilbao, Spain, Guerrero started his career at Málaga, before joining Real Madrid in 2017.

Despite being a midfielder, he has amassed an impressive goal tally for Los Blancos youth teams, notable scoring in eight consecutive games in the 2020/21 season.

Due to his father's legendary status at Athletic Bilbao, Guerrero has found himself constantly linked with the Biscay club.

In October 2021, he was included in The Guardian's "Next Generation" list for 2021 - highlighting the best young players in the world.

International career
Guerrero has represented Spain at under-15, under-16 and under-18 level. His under-18 international career got off to an explosive start; having scored a hat-trick against Turkey, he followed this up with a goal against Romania.

Personal life
Guerrero is the son of former Spanish international footballer, and Athletic Bilbao legend, Julen Guerrero, and the nephew of José Félix Guerrero.

References

External links
 

2004 births
Living people
Footballers from Bilbao
Spanish footballers
Spain youth international footballers
Association football midfielders
Málaga CF players
Real Madrid CF players